The Rio Cautário State Extractive Reserve is an extractive reserve in the state of Rondônia, Brazil.

Location

The Rio Cautário State Extractive Reserve is divided between the municipalities of Guajará-Mirim (47.5%) and Costa Marques (52.5%) in the state of Rondônia.
The reserve lies to the northwest of the BR-429 highway from São Francisco do Guaporé to Costa Marques on the border with Bolivia.
It adjoins the Rio Cautário Federal Extractive Reserve to the north of its eastern part, separated from the federal reserve by the Cautário River.
The Cautário River runs through the west part of the reserve to join the Guaporé River on the border with Bolivia.
In the southwest the reserve is bounded by the Guaporé River.

Environment

The Cautário River is a meandering river with clear water.
The river rises in the Uru-Eu-Wau-Wau Indigenous Territory and receives tributaries from the Serra Uopianes and the Serra Pacaás Novos. 
It is fed by a region without major deforestation and silting of the river's margins. 
The most rugged stretch is between Redenção e Bom Destino.
It is navigable, even in the middle section around Bom Destino, but only in the rainy season.

During the wet season extensive areas of the forest are flooded.
The climate is hot and humid, with temperatures of  throughout the year.
The reserve is covered by open submontane rainforest (63%), pioneer alluvial formations (15.5%), dense alluvial rainforest (8.6%) and savanna (6.5%).
The forest is well-preserved near the waterways.

History

On 18 November 1991 a ban was placed on settlement, deforestation, professional fishing, logging, mining and other activities in the proposed  Rio Cautário Sustainable Extraction State Forest.
This ban did not apply to the small farmers, rubber tappers and fishing people living in the area.

It was placed under the Instituto de Terras e Colonização of Rondônia State (ITERON).
The decree creating the reserve noted the great pressure of predatory activity on forest areas occupied by traditional populations, which was causing irreversible loss of plant and wildlife resources, and exacerbating social conflicts.
The deliberative council was created on 21 August 2009.

As of 2016 the reserve was supported by the Amazon Region Protected Areas Program (ARPA).
In January 2016 SEDAM announced findings of illegal activity in the previous quarter in nine units that benefited from ARPA in the state.

Economy

The area has been used for rubber extraction for more than 100 years, but only 6.5% of the land has been altered by human occupation.
The residents earn income from production of flour and other agricultural products.
There are five communities in the reserve.
There are two schools, although only one was operating in 2011, and two health centres.
The reserve is managed by the Associação de Seringueiros do Vale do Guaporé (AGUAPÉ).
Residents strongly support AGUAPÉ, one of the best organised of such associations in the state.

There is a usage plan and a development plan created through technical cooperation between the United Nations Development Programme and Rondônia.
There is also a plan for community forest management created due to decline in demand for rubber.
Two serious obstacles to managing the reserve are its inaccessibility and the illiteracy of the leaders.

Notes

Sources

Extractive reserves of Brazil
Protected areas of Rondônia
1995 establishments in Brazil